A by-election was to be held for the New South Wales Legislative Assembly electorate of Argyle on 17 February 1857 because the seat of John Plunkett was declared vacant due to his appointment as President of the Legislative Council.

Dates

Results

John Plunkett was appointed President of the Legislative Council.

See also
Electoral results for the district of Argyle
List of New South Wales state by-elections

References

1857 elections in Australia
New South Wales state by-elections
1850s in New South Wales